Hybris (also known as Snow White, Vecna.22528, and Full Moon) is a computer worm believed to have been written by Brazilian virus writer Vecna, member of the computer virus writing group 29A. It first appeared in September 2000 and became more common in January 2001.

Hybris typically comes from an email that appears to be from hahaha@sexyfun.net. Malicious "plug-ins" enhanced Hybris's functionality to include various other e-mail types. Other plugin functionalities include a spinning "wheel of hypnosis."

The name Hybris originates from the text within the virus: "HYBRIS" "(c) Vecna".

External links
F-Secure Description
CERT: Open mail relays used to deliver "Hybris Worm"
The Register: "Vandals behind spread of Hybris worm named"

Email worms